Figitumumab (previously CP-751871) is a monoclonal antibody targeting the insulin-like growth factor-1 receptor that was investigated for the treatment of various types of cancer, for example adrenocortical carcinoma and non-small cell lung cancer (NSCLC).

This drug was being developed by Pfizer, but they ceased development of the drug in January 2011 and has stopped its manufacture.

Anti-cancer mechanism
See Insulin-like growth factor 1 receptor role in cancer.

Clinical trials
The first phase III trial (for NSCLC) was suspended in December 2009 due to excess deaths but others continued.

It was to have been included in the I-SPY2 breast cancer trial.

References 

Monoclonal antibodies for tumors
Pfizer brands
Abandoned drugs